McNally Peak is a peak  high, standing  west of Mount Farley, near the southeast side of Holdsworth Glacier, in the Queen Maud Mountains of Antarctica. It was named by the Advisory Committee on Antarctic Names for Commander Joseph John McNally (15 Feb 1928-13 Jan 2019), U.S. Navy, supply officer at McMurdo Station, winter 1959, and on the staff of the Commander, U.S. Naval Support Force, Antarctica, during U.S. Navy Operation Deep Freeze 1967.

References

Mountains of the Ross Dependency
Amundsen Coast
Queen Maud Mountains